Gomer Griffith Smith (July 11, 1896 – May 26, 1953) was an American politician and a U.S. Representative from Oklahoma from 1937 to 1939.

Early life and education
Born on a farm near Kansas City, Missouri, Smith was the son of Joseph M. and Elizabeth Lewis Smith, and attended the common and high schools of Missouri. He was graduated from Rockingham Academy, Kansas City, Missouri, in 1915.

While teaching in a country school near Excelsior Springs, Missouri from 1916 to 1918, Smith studied law. He was admitted to the Missouri bar in 1920, to the Oklahoma bar in 1922, and commenced practice in Oklahoma City, Oklahoma.

Congress
Elected as a Democrat to the Seventy-fifth Congress to fill the vacancy caused by the death of Robert P. Hill, Smith served from December 10, 1937, to January 3, 1939. He was not a candidate for renomination in 1938, but was an unsuccessful candidate for the Democratic nomination for United States Senator, and resumed the practice of law in Oklahoma City.

Private life
He married Hazel Mae Mizner, and they were the parents of a son and three daughters. They also adopted Gomer's youngest brother.

Death
Died in Oklahoma City, Oklahoma County, Oklahoma, on May 26, 1953 (age 56 years, 319 days). He is entombed in mausoleum at Rose Hill Burial Park, Oklahoma City.

References

External links

 

1896 births
1953 deaths
Oklahoma lawyers
Politicians from Kansas City, Missouri
Politicians from Oklahoma City
Democratic Party members of the United States House of Representatives from Oklahoma
20th-century American politicians
20th-century American lawyers